Beeston is a civil parish in Cheshire West and Chester, England.  It contains 19 buildings that are recorded in the National Heritage List for England as designated listed buildings.  The major building in the parish is Beeston Castle, the rest of the parish being rural.  The listed buildings consist of the castle and its associated structures, farms and farm buildings, houses and associated structures, and a hotel.

Key

Buildings

See also
Listed buildings in Peckforton
Listed buildings in Burwardsley
Listed buildings in Tattenhall
Listed buildings in Foulk Stapleford
Listed buildings in Tiverton
Listed buildings in Bunbury
Listed buildings in Spurstow

References
Citations

Sources

Listed buildings in Cheshire West and Chester
Lists of listed buildings in Cheshire